Common names: hognosed pitviper, hognosed pit viper, rainforest hognosed pitviper, horned hog-nosed viper.
Porthidium nasutum is a venomous pitviper species found in southern Mexico, Central America and northern South America. No subspecies are currently recognized.

Description

Females are considerably larger than males. Moderately stout and terrestrial.

Geographic range
Found in southern Mexico southward through Central America to western Colombia and northwestern Ecuador in South America. Inhabits the Atlantic lowlands from Mexico (Tabasco and Chiapas) through Belize, Guatemala, Honduras, Nicaragua and Costa Rica to eastern Panama and northwestern Colombia. In the Pacific lowlands, it occurs in southwestern Costa Rica, central and eastern Panama, continuing on to northwestern Ecuador. The type locality given is "Pansos [Panzós], sur les bords du Polochic [Alta Verapaz] (Guatémala)."

Conservation status
This species is classified as Least Concern (LC) on the IUCN Red List of Threatened Species. It is a widespread and moderately common species that is not facing major threats.

References

Further reading
 Bocourt, M.F. 1868. Descriptions de quelques Crotaliens nouveaux appartenant au genre Bothrops, recueillis dans le Guatémala. Annales des sciences naturelles, Series 5, 10: 201-202. ("Bothrops nasutus n. sp.", p. 202.)

External links
 Porthidium nasutum  at Honduras Silvestre . Accessed 12 February 2008.

nasutum
Snakes of North America
Snakes of Central America
Snakes of South America
Reptiles of Belize
Reptiles of Colombia
Reptiles of Costa Rica
Reptiles of Ecuador
Reptiles of Guatemala
Reptiles of Honduras
Reptiles of Mexico
Reptiles of Nicaragua
Reptiles of Panama
Least concern biota of North America
Reptiles described in 1868
Taxa named by Marie Firmin Bocourt